Guy Kawasaki (born August 30, 1954) is an American marketing specialist, author, and Silicon Valley venture capitalist. He was one of the Apple employees originally responsible for marketing their Macintosh computer line in 1984. He popularized the word evangelist in marketing the Macintosh as an "Apple evangelist" and the concepts of evangelism marketing and technology evangelism/platform evangelism in general.

From March 2015 until December 2016, Kawasaki sat on the Wikimedia Foundation board of trustees, the non-profit operating entity of Wikipedia.

Kawasaki has also written fifteen books, including The Macintosh Way (1990), The Art of the Start (2004), and Wise Guy: Lessons from a Life (2019).

Early life 
Guy Kawasaki was born in Honolulu, Hawaii to Duke Takeshi Kawasaki (d. 2015) and Aiko Kawasaki. His family lived in an area outside Honolulu called Kalihi Valley. His father, Duke, once served as a fireman, real estate broker, state senator, and government official while his mother was a housewife. He attended ʻIolani School and graduated in 1972.

Kawasaki graduated from Stanford University in 1976 with a Bachelor of Arts degree in psychology. He then attended law school at UC Davis, but quit after about a week of classes when he realized that he hated law school. In 1977, he enrolled in the UCLA Anderson School of Management, where he earned an MBA degree. While there, Kawasaki also worked at a jewelry company, Nova Stylings. Kawasaki observed, "The jewelry business is a very, very tough business, tougher than the computer business... I learned a very valuable lesson: how to sell."

Career 

In 1983, Kawasaki got a job at Apple through his Stanford roommate, Mike Boich. He was Apple's chief evangelist for four years. In a 2006 podcast interview on the online site Venture Voice, Kawasaki said, "What got me to leave is basically I started listening to my own hype, and I wanted to start a software company and really make big bucks." In 1987 he was hired to lead ACIUS, the U.S. subsidiary of France-based ACI, which published an Apple database software system called 4th Dimension.

Kawasaki left ACIUS in 1989 to further his writing and speaking career. In the early 1990s he wrote columns that were featured in Forbes and MacUser magazines. He also founded another company, Fog City Software, which created Emailer, an email client that sold to Claris. A collection of namesake software utilities called Guy's Utilities for Macintosh (GUM), was published by After Hours Software in the early 1990s. An edition of GUM for PowerBook systems was acquired by Gordon Eubanks and was subsequently remarketed by Symantec as The Norton Essentials for PowerBook.

He returned to Apple as an Apple Fellow in 1995. In 1998, he was a co-founder of Garage Technology Ventures, a venture capital firm that has made investments in Pandora Radio, Tripwire, The Motley Fool and D.light Design. In 2007, he founded Truemors, a free-flow rumor mill, that sold to NowPublic. He is also a founder at Alltop, an online magazine rack.

In March 2013, Kawasaki joined Google as an advisor to Motorola. His role was to create a Google+ mobile device community.

In April 2014, Kawasaki became the chief evangelist of Canva. It is a free graphic design website for non-designers as well as professionals and was founded in January 2013.

On March 24, 2015, Kawasaki joined Wikimedia Foundation's board of trustees. He stepped down at the end of December 2016.

On April 25, 2017, WikiTribune mentioned him as an adviser.

On February 26, 2019, Penguin Group released Wise Guy, described as Kawasaki's most personal book to date. While the book is written as what could be considered a memoir, it contains a series of vignettes that include various personal experiences that Kawasaki says have enlightened and inspired him.

December 2019 to Current, Kawasaki created a podcast called Remarkable People. There are now over 90 episodes available including interviews with Jane Goodall, Stephen Wolfram, Andrew Yang and Sal Khan. Kawasaki has stated that he believed the podcast was his best and most under appreciated work.

Personal life 
Kawasaki and his wife have four children: Nicodemus ("Nic"), Noah, Nohemi, and Nate. Nohemi and Nate are biological siblings whom the couple adopted from Guatemala.

Bibliography 
 The Macintosh Way (1990) .
 Database 101 (1991) .
 Selling the Dream (1992) .
 The Computer Curmudgeon (1993) .
 Hindsights (1995) .
 How to Drive Your Competition Crazy (1995) .
 Rules for Revolutionaries (2000) .
 The Art of the Start (2004) .
 Reality Check (2008) .
 Enchantment: The Art of Changing Hearts, Minds, and Actions (2011). Portfolio Penguin, London. .
 What the Plus! Google+ for the rest of us (2012) (only available on Amazon Kindle, iBooks, and on Google Play).
 APE: Author, Publisher, Entrepreneur—How to Publish a Book (2013). (Guy Kawasaki; Shawn Welch) Nononina Press .
 The Art of Social Media: Power Tips for Power Users (2015) (Guy Kawasaki; Peg Fitzpatrick) .
 The Art of the Start 2.0: The Time-Tested, Battle-Hardened Guide for Anyone Starting Anything (2015) Portfolio .
 Wise Guy: Lessons from a Life (2019) Penguin Group .

References

External links 

 
 Alltop.com co-founder
 

1954 births
20th-century American businesspeople
20th-century American writers
21st-century American non-fiction writers
21st-century American businesspeople
American technology chief executives
American technology writers
American writers of Japanese descent
Apple Inc. employees
Apple Fellows
Hawaii people of Japanese descent
Businesspeople from Hawaii
Edu-Ware
Wikimedia Foundation Board of Trustees members
Google employees
ʻIolani School alumni
Living people
Motorola employees
Silicon Valley people
Stanford University alumni
UCLA Anderson School of Management alumni
Writers from Honolulu
American Wikimedians
Shorty Award winners